Oskar Lõvi (6 February 1903 Tallinn – 2 September 1942 Sverdlovsk, Russia) was an Estonian journalist and politician. He was a member of VI Riigikogu (its Chamber of Deputies).

References

1903 births
1942 deaths
Estonian journalists
Members of the Estonian National Assembly
Members of the Riigivolikogu
People who died in the Gulag
Estonian people executed by the Soviet Union
People from Tallinn
Politicians from Tallinn